Minting is a village and civil parish in the East Lindsey district of Lincolnshire, England. The population (including Gautby) at the 2011 census was 286.

Minting Priory was located here.

Minting is one of the Thankful Villages that suffered no fatalities during the Great War of 1914 to 1918.   Today it is a small village that has a population of about 167 people.

A heritage walk around the village can be downloaded from the village website (see below).

References

External links

Parish Council

Villages in Lincolnshire
Civil parishes in Lincolnshire
East Lindsey District